Oh In-Kyun  (born 29 January 1985) is a retired South Korean professional footballer as a midfielder.

References

External links
 Oh In-kyun Liga Indonesia
 Oh In-kyun Soccerway

1985 births
Living people
South Korean footballers
South Korean expatriate footballers
Chungju Hummel FC players
Balestier Khalsa FC players
PSMS Medan players
Persela Lamongan players
Gresik United players
Mitra Kukar players
Persib Bandung players
Persipura Jayapura players
Arema F.C. players
Korea National League players
Singapore Premier League players
Liga 1 (Indonesia) players
South Korean expatriate sportspeople in Singapore
Expatriate footballers in Singapore
South Korean expatriate sportspeople in Indonesia
Expatriate footballers in Indonesia
Association football midfielders
Footballers from Seoul